Shanabad (also Romanized as Shānābād; also known as Shahīnābād) is a village in Miyan Rud Rural District, Qolqol Rud District, Tuyserkan County, Hamadan Province, Iran. At the 2006 census, its population was 1,020, in 224 families.

References 

Populated places in Tuyserkan County